"Paradise in Your Eyes" is a song written and recorded by American R&B singer Jermaine Jackson. It was released as the second single from his 1981 album, I Like Your Style in February 1982.

Charts

References

1981 songs
1982 singles
Jermaine Jackson songs
Songs written by Jermaine Jackson